76 is the debut studio album by Dutch DJ and record producer Armin van Buuren. It was released on 16 June 2003 by United Recordings.

Track listing

Charts

References

External links
 

2003 debut albums
Armin van Buuren albums